Government College, Birnin Kudu is a secondary school in Birnin Kudu, Jigawa State. Founded as a middle school in 1947 by the regional government, the college has some notable alumni. including  five governors and industrialist Aliko Dangote.

Notable alumni 
 Abubakar Rimi - Governor of Kano
 Sule Lamido - Governor of Jigawa
Abdullahi Umar Ganduje - Governor of Kano
 Aliko Dangote - Chairman of Dangote Group
 Aminu Ado Bayero - 15th Emir of Kano
 Senator (Arc.) Kabiru Ibrahim Gaya-Governor of Kano 
 Senator Bello Maitama Yusuf-Former Minister of trade and investment in the second republic, FRN.
 Barrister Ali Sa'ad Birnin Kudu-Governor of Jigawa 
 Alhaji Lamido Sanusi Ado Bayero-Former Managing Director, Nigerian Ports Authority.
 Brigadier General Lawal Jafar Isah-Former Military Administrator of Kaduna
Dr. Junaidu Mohammed- a member of House of Representatives in the Second Republic and the vice presidential candidate of the Social Democratic Party in Nigeria’s 2019 presidential elections.
Alhaji Halilu Ahmed Getso-Veteran Journalist
Alhaji Kassim M. Bichi
Dr. Tafida Abubakar Ila-Emir of Rano

References 

Secondary schools in Nigeria
Jigawa State
Educational institutions established in 1947
1947 establishments in Nigeria
Government schools in Nigeria